This is a list of newspapers in Angola.

See also
 Media of Angola

References

Bibliography

External links
 

newspapers
Angola
newspapers